This is the discography of Serbian and former Yugoslav rock band Bajaga i Instruktori. This discography consists of 9 studio albums, 2 live albums, 1 7-inch single, 1 EP, 4 compilation albums, and 1 box set. This list does not include solo material or side projects performed by the members.

Studio albums

Live albums

Extended plays

Compilation albums

Singles

External links
Bajaga i Instruktori discography at Discogs

Discographies of Serbian artists
Rock music group discographies